Richard Thomas Byas (March 19, 1910 – October 8, 1985), nicknamed "Subby", was an American Negro league catcher in the 1930s and 1940s.

A native of Sabine County, Texas, Byas attended Wendell Phillips Academy High School in Chicago, Illinois, and made his Negro leagues debut in 1932 for the Chicago American Giants. Byas played several more seasons with Chicago, and was selected to represent the team in the East–West All-Star Game in 1936 and 1937. He died in Chicago in 1985 at age 75.

References

External links
 and Baseball-Reference Black Baseball stats and Seamheads

1910 births
1985 deaths
Chicago American Giants players
Memphis Red Sox players
20th-century African-American sportspeople
Baseball catchers